NA-182 Layyah-II is a constituency for the National Assembly of Pakistan.

Election 2002 

General elections were held on 10 Oct 2002. Malik Niaz Ahmad Jakhar of PPP won by 74,932 votes.

Election 2008 

General elections were held on 18 Feb 2008. Syed Muhammad Saqlain Shah Bukhari of PML-N won by 75,910 votes.

Election 2013 

General elections were held on 11 May 2013. Syed Muhammad Saqlain Shah Bukhari of PML-N won by 85,292 votes and became the  member of National Assembly.

Election 2018 

General elections are scheduled to be held on 25 July 2018.

See also
NA-181 Layyah-I
NA-183 Taunsa

References

External links 
Election result's official website

NA-182